Praveen Chakravarty is an Indian politician belonging to the Congress Party. He is the Chairman of the Data Analytics department, appointed by Rahul Gandhi. He is the brains behind SHAKTI, the controversial project that tried to modernise the Congress party. He along with P.Chidambaram drafted the NYAY scheme for the party's 2019 election manifesto with help from Nobel Laureate Prof. Abhijit Banerjee among others.

Chakravarty was a political economist scholar in a think tank, an investment banker and angel investor before entering politics. (praveenchakravarty.in). It was widely reported that Chakravarty will be the Congress candidate for Member of Parliament of the Upper House in 2021 from the state of Tamil Nadu

Early life
Praveen Chakravarty was born in Tamilnadu, Chennai and is an alumnus of BITS, Pilani and has an MBA from Wharton School. (praveenchakravarty.in)

Career
Praveen Chakravarty started his career with IBM in Japan and subsequently moved to Microsoft. He switched to investment banking in New York and San Francisco, after receiving his MBA from Wharton. Chakravarty moved to India to set up Thomas Weisel's India operations and 2 years later, captured headlines in a high-profile move to BNP Paribas as Managing Director with his entire team from Thomas Weisel. 4 years later, in a sudden move that caught everyone by surprise, he joined Nandan Nilekani's team at Aadhaar.

He is a co-founder of Mumbai Angels and is ranked among the top five angel investors in the country by a survey.  He was also a contributing editor at BloombergQuint where he hosted a popular monthly column called "Noise To Signal".

Chakravarty has served on many corporate boards. He was the founding board member of many successful startups.

He then became a scholar in a think tank and published extensive research on India's economic divergence among its states.

Chakravarty is a prolific writer on India's political economy and has co-authored articles with former Prime Minister Dr.Manmohan Singh and former Finance Minister P.Chidambaram.

He was a founding trustee of the respected data journalism non-profit, IndiaSpend and was a board member of legislative research firm, PRS Legislative.

References

External links
Profile

Living people
Indian investment bankers
Birla Institute of Technology and Science, Pilani alumni
Year of birth missing (living people)